This article is not AFC Challenge Cup.

2011 Asian Challenge Cup is the annual football event held in Hong Kong during the Lunar New Year. The name of this event in 2011 changed from Lunar New Year Cup to Asian Challenge Cup.

Teams

Squads

Guangzhou Evergrande

South China

Tianjin Teda

Ulsan Hyundai

Results

Semi-finals

Third place match

Final

References

External links
 Asian Challenge Cup - Hong Kong Football Association

International association football competitions hosted by Hong Kong
Lunar New Year Cup
Asia